Alou Traoré (born 6 November 1974) is a retired Malian international footballer who played for Djoliba, Pyunik, Sorkhpooshan, Saipa and Tractor Sazi.

Career

Club
Traoré had two spells in his native Mali playing for Djoliba, a spell in Armenia with Pyunik and a in Iran with Sorkhpooshan, Saipa and Tractor Sazi.

International
Traoré played for the Mali national football team between 1994 and 2002. He was part of the 2002 FIFA World Cup qualifying squad for Mali.

Career statistics

Club

International

References

External links
Alou Traoré player profile on Sorkhpooshan Delvar Afzar Official Site

Living people
1974 births
Association football defenders
Tractor S.C. players
Malian footballers
Expatriate footballers in Armenia
Expatriate footballers in Iran
FC Pyunik players
Saipa F.C. players
Djoliba AC players
Sportspeople from Bamako
Armenian Premier League players
Mali international footballers
21st-century Malian people